Micromyrtus sessilis is a plant in the myrtle family, Myrtaceae and is endemic to eastern Australia. It is a dense, spreading shrub with small, more or less linear leaves and flowers that are sometimes single in the upper leaf axils or in dense clusters along the branches. It is similar to M. ciliata but has a more northerly distribution.

Description
The flowers are sometimes arranged singly in upper leaf axils, sometimes form small heads and are sometimes arranged in dense clusters. There are two bracteoles at the base of each flower and which fall off as the flower opens. The floral cup is cone-shaped and has rounded ribs on its side. Flowering mainly occurs in September and October.

Taxonomy and naming
Micromyrtus sessilis was first formally described in 1983 by John Green from a specimen collected near Miles and the description was published in Nuytsia.  The specific epithet (sessilis) is a Latin word meaning "sitting" referring to the flowers having a very short, or no peduncle.

Distribution and habitat
This species occurs between Miles in Queensland and Griffith in New South Wales, mainly above , in a range of habitats from mallee to forest, often in rocky places.

Gallery

References

Myrtales of Australia
sessilis
Flora of New South Wales
Flora of Queensland
Plants described in 1983